Sailing at the 2011 All-Africa Games in Maputo, Mozambique was held between September 5–11, 2011.

Medal summary

Medal table

References

2011 All-Africa Games
All-Africa Games
2011 All-Africa Games
Sailing competitions in Mozambique